Overland Park is a city in Johnson County, Kansas, United States, and the second-most populous city in the state of Kansas.  It is one of four principal cities in the Kansas City metropolitan area and the most populous suburb of Kansas City, Missouri. As of the 2020 census, the population of the city was 197,238.

History
In 1905, William B. Strang Jr. arrived and began to plot subdivisions along an old military roadway, which later became the city's principal thoroughfare. He developed large portions of what would later become downtown Overland Park.

On May 20, 1960, Overland Park was officially incorporated as a "city of first class", with a population of 28,085. Less than thirty years later, the population had nearly quadrupled to 111,790 in 1990, increasing to 173,250 as of the 2010 census. Overland Park officially became the second largest city in the state, following Wichita, Kansas, after passing Kansas City, Kansas in the early 2000s.

Population growth in the city can mainly be attributed to the traditional greenfield suburban development, appreciated on the city's annexation map. Overland Park's last annexation attempt, in 2008, garnered widespread news coverage after massive outcry from affected residents.

On April 13, 2014, a pair of shootings committed by a lone gunman occurred at the local Jewish Community Center of Greater Kansas City and Village Shalom, a local Jewish retirement community. A total of three people were killed in both shootings. The suspected gunman, described as a man in his seventies, later identified as Neo-Nazi Frazier Glenn Miller, Jr., was taken into custody.

Geography

Overland Park is located in northeastern Kansas at the junction of Interstate 435 and U.S. Route 69 immediately east of Olathe, the county seat.

The city lies on the northern edge of the Osage Plains a few miles south of the Kansas River. One of the river's tributaries, Turkey Creek, flows northeast through the extreme northern part of the city. South of Turkey Creek, the majority of the city lies in the watershed of the Blue River. Several of the river's tributaries run east-northeast across the city; from north to south, these include Indian Creek, Tomahawk Creek, and Negro Creek. In the far southern part of the city, two more tributaries, Coffee Creek and Wolf Creek, join to form the main stem of the Blue River itself.

Overland Park is a principal city of the Kansas City metropolitan area, and it borders other communities on all sides. These include Kansas City, Kansas, to the north, Mission and Prairie Village to the northeast, Leawood to the east, Stilwell to the south, Olathe and Lenexa to the west, and Shawnee and Merriam to the northwest. Most of Overland Park, specifically the part of it lying north of 159th Street, lies within the area of Johnson County referred to as Shawnee Mission.

Climate
Overland Park lies in the transition zone between North America's humid subtropical climate and humid continental climate zones, typically experiencing hot, humid summers and cold, dry winters.

Surrounding cities

Demographics

2010 census
As of the 2010 United States Census, there were 173,372 people, 71,443 households, and 45,516 families residing in the city. The racial makeup of the city was 84.4% White, 4.3% African American, 0.3% American Indian, 6.3% Asian, 2.1% from other races, and 2.5% from two or more races. Hispanics and Latinos of any race were 6.3% of the population.

There were 71,443 households, of which 30.6% had children under the age of 18 living with them, 52.0% were married couples living together, 8.4% had a female householder with no husband present, 3.2% had a male householder with no wife present, and 36.3% were non-families. 29.8% of all households were made up of individuals, and 8.7% had someone living alone who was 65 years of age or older. The average household size was 2.41, and the average family size was 3.04.

The median age in the city was 37.8 years. 24.7% of residents were under the age of 18; 7.4% were between the ages of 18 and 24; 28.2% were from 25 to 44; 27.6% were from 45 to 64; and 12.3% were 65 years of age or older. The gender makeup of the city was 48.3% male and 51.7% female.

The median income for a household in the city was $71,513, and the median income for a family was $93,293. Males had a median income of $65,210 versus $43,413 for females. The per capita income for the city was $39,319. 4.9% of the population and 3.3% of families were living below the poverty line, including 6.5% of those under the age of 18 and 4.9% of those 65 and older.

Metropolitan area
Overland Park is a principal city of both the Kansas City, MO–KS Metropolitan Statistical Area and the Kansas City–Overland Park–Kansas City, MO–KS Combined Statistical Area.

Economy

The service sector constitutes most of the local economy. Health care, retail trade, professional and technical services, finance and insurance, and information technology are the city's five largest industries. Companies with headquarters in the city include Yellow Corporation, Black & Veatch, Ash Grove Cement Company, and Compass Minerals.  The city seeks to attract technology companies in particular, such as Netsmart Technologies which relocated its headquarters there in 2011.  Restaurant chain Applebee's was headquartered in the city from 1993 to 2007. It is also home to the Overland Park Xchange building, the 3rd largest office building in the Kansas City Metropolitan Area totalling 735,000 square feet of office space.

As of 2014, 71.8% of the population over the age of 16 was in the labor force. 0.1% was in the armed forces, and 71.7% was in the civilian labor force with 68.1% being employed and 3.7% unemployed. The composition, by occupation, of the employed civilian labor force was:  53.0% in management, business, science, and arts; 26.2% in sales and office occupations; 11.3% in service occupations; 4.0% in natural resources, construction, and maintenance; 5.5% in production, transportation, and material moving. The three industries employing the largest percentages of the working civilian labor force were:  educational services, health care, and social assistance (22.5%); professional, scientific, management, administrative, and waste management services (17.4%); and retail trade (10.7%). T-Mobile (former Sprint headquarters) is the largest employer in the city followed by Shawnee Mission School District, Johnson County Community College, Blue Valley School District, Black & Veatch, OptumRx, the City of Overland Park, Yellow Corporation, Overland Park Regional Medical Center, and Waddell & Reed.

The cost of living in Overland Park is below average; compared to a U.S. average of 100, the cost of living index for the city is 88.2. As of 2014, the median home value in the city was $225,000, the median selected monthly owner cost was $1,712 for housing units with a mortgage and $570 for those without, and the median gross rent was $974.

It was home to the Sprint Corporation before its merger with T-Mobile in 2020.  Part of its former corporate campus was sold in 2019 to a firm named Occidental Management.  Telephone company Embarq formerly had its national headquarters in Overland Park before its acquisition by CenturyTel in 2009, and still employs several hundred people in Gardner.

Top employers
According to the city's 2016 Comprehensive Annual Financial Report, the top employers in the city are:

Government
Under state statute, Overland Park is a city of the first class. Since 1963, it has had a mayor-council-manager form of government. The city council consists of 13 members popularly elected every four years with staggered terms in office. For representative purposes, the city is divided into six wards with two members elected from each ward. The mayor is the 13th member, elected at-large. The council sets policy for the city, annually identifies city priorities for the Kansas Legislature and the United States Congress, and authorizes ordinances, resolutions, contracts, and agreements. The council meets on the first and third Monday of each month. The mayor presides over council meetings, appoints members to resident boards and commissions, meets with constituents, and signs ordinances, resolutions, contracts, and agreements authorized by the council. The city manager administers city operations and implements policies set by the city council.

Overland Park lies within Kansas's 3rd U.S. Congressional District, which is represented by Sharice Davids. For the purposes of representation in the Kansas Legislature, the city is located in the 6th through 8th, 10th, 11th, 21st, and 37th districts of the Kansas Senate and the 8th, 16th, 19th through 24th, 27th through 29th, and 48th districts of the Kansas House of Representatives.

Law enforcement
The Overland Park Police Department is the main agency to patrol all of Overland Park with the Johnson County Sheriff's Office also assisting with serving papers and other court documents to people who work in the city as well as patrolling the unincorporated parts of the county and other cities in the county. OPPD has 310 full-time employees and 255 commissioned personnel. The current police chief is Frank Donchez.

The Kansas Highway Patrol tends to patrol the various interstates running through the city including Interstate 35 in Kansas which runs through Overland Park along with U.S. Route 69 in Kansas which runs through Overland Park and Interstate 635 (Kansas-Missouri) on the Overland Park section being the main highways patrolled by KHP in Overland Park. However the KHP also does assist OPPD in instances such as car chases, traffic stops and other instances of officer needs assistance calls.

Education

Primary and secondary education
Overland Park spans four public school districts. The portion of the city north of Interstate 435 lies within the Shawnee Mission School District (SMSD). SMSD, which is headquartered in Overland Park, operates thirty eight elementary schools, two middle schools, six high schools, and multiple support facilities in the city. Most of the city south of I-435 lies within the Blue Valley School District. Blue Valley, also based in Overland Park, operates 20 elementary schools, nine middle schools, five high schools, and one alternative high school in the city. A portion of western Overland Park lies within the Olathe Public Schools district which operates two elementary schools in the city. The extreme southwestern part of Overland Park lies within the Spring Hill School District.

There are more than 12 private and parochial schools in Overland Park. The Roman Catholic Archdiocese of Kansas City in Kansas oversees five Catholic schools in the city including four elementary schools and St. Thomas Aquinas High School. The Lutheran Church–Missouri Synod oversees two schools, Bethany Lutheran School (Grades K–8) and Christ Lutheran School (K–8). The Wisconsin Evangelical Lutheran Synod oversees a third Lutheran school, Mount Olive Lutheran School (K–8). Other Christian schools in the city are Kansas City Christian School's Oxford Park Campus (PK–2) and Overland Christian Schools (PK–12). Overland Park also hosts one Jewish school, Hyman Brand Hebrew Academy (K–12). Non-religious private schools in the city include Accelerated Schools of Overland Park (4–12) and two Montessori schools.

Kansas City Japanese School, a Japanese weekend educational program, is held at the Kansas Christian College in Overland Park.

K–12 schools:
 Blue Valley School District
 Shawnee Mission School District
 Olathe Public Schools
 Spring Hill Schools
 St. Thomas Aquinas High School
 Ascension Catholic School
 Bethany Lutheran
 John Paul the Second
 Oxford Campus Kansas City Christian
 Overland Christian
 Mt. Olive
 Hyman Brand Hebrew Academy
 Holy Spirit
 Holy Cross
 Christ Lutheran
Horizon Academy

Colleges and universities
 Cleveland University-Kansas City (formerly Cleveland Chiropractic College)
 Ottawa University – adult campus
 University of Kansas Edwards Campus
 Johnson County Community College
 Baker University – satellite campus
 Emporia State University – satellite campus
 Kansas Christian College
 Rasmussen College
The Accreditation Council for Business Schools and Programs is based in Overland Park; its competitive peer, the International Assembly for Collegiate Business Education, is based in neighboring Lenexa.

Libraries
The Johnson County Library serves the entire county with 14 locations, three of which are in Overland Park (Blue Valley, Central Resource, and Oak Park).

Infrastructure

Transportation
Interstate 435, the Kansas City area's beltway, and U.S. Route 50 run concurrently east–west through central Overland Park. Interstate 35 runs northeast–southwest through the city's northwestern and northern fringe. U.S. Route 56 and U.S. Route 169 run concurrently with I-35 through the city's northwestern fringe and then split off to the east as Shawnee Mission Parkway at interchange 226, running east–west through northern Overland Park. U.S. Route 69 runs generally north–south through the city, merging with I-35, U.S. 56, and U.S. 169 at interchange 225 just northwest of the city. U.S. 69 then splits off to the east with U.S. 56 and U.S. 169 as Shawnee Mission Parkway before turning north again as Metcalf Avenue. In extreme northern Overland Park, U.S. 69 then re-merges with I-35. Metcalf Avenue continues north out of the city as Interstate 635.

Johnson County Transit, also known as "The JO", provides public transportation via multiple bus routes throughout the city. Several of these routes connect Overland Park with other suburbs and downtown Kansas City, Missouri.

Johnson County Executive Airport, a public general aviation facility, is located immediately west of the city in Olathe.

BNSF Railway and Union Pacific Railroad each operate a freight rail line through Overland Park. The BNSF line runs roughly parallel with I-35 through the northwestern and northern fringe of the city. The Union Pacific line runs northeast through the extreme southeastern part of the city.

Utilities
Evergy (formerly Kansas City Power and Light (KCP&L)) provides electric power. Google Fiber, AT&T, Spectrum, and Consolidated Communications offer cable television, landline telephone, and broadband internet service. Local residents predominantly use natural gas for heating fuel; utility gas service is provided by Atmos Energy and Kansas Gas Service. WaterOne, an independent public utility, oversees water provision, distribution, and infrastructure maintenance. The Johnson County Wastewater department manages waste water collection, transportation, and treatment. Multiple privately owned trash haulers, evaluated and given permits by the city government, offer trash removal and recycling service.

Health care
Three general medical and surgical hospitals which provide emergency services—Menorah Medical Center, Saint Luke's South Hospital, and Overland Park Regional Medical Center—are all located in Overland Park. In addition, Advent Medical Center is located in neighboring Merriam. There are also several specialty hospitals in Overland Park:  Children's Mercy South, Heartland Surgical Specialty Hospital, Mid-America Rehabilitation Hospital, and Specialty Hospital of Mid-America, an acute long-term care facility.

Media

The Kansas City Star, Kansas City's main daily newspaper, provides coverage of local news and publishes an edition specific to Johnson County. In addition, two newspapers are published in Overland Park:  the Campus Ledger, the bi-weekly Johnson County Community College student newspaper, and Kansas City Nursing News, a weekly trade publication.

Overland Park is in both the Kansas City radio and television markets. One radio station broadcasts from Overland Park: KCCV. It broadcasts on both 760 AM and 92.3 FM, playing a Religious format. KCCV is the flagship station of the Bott Radio Network (BRN), a network of Christian radio stations which is headquartered in Overland Park.

Parks and recreation
The city's 72 parks offer public golf, sand volleyball, hiking and biking trails, playgrounds, tennis courts, basketball courts, and reservable shelters.

Culture

Points of interest

The Oak Park Mall is one of the area's top shopping locations with nearly 200 stores.

The Johnson County Arts and Heritage Center houses the Johnson County Museum, KidScape, resident theatre company Theatre in the Park, a fine arts program, an emerging arts program, and the Overland Park Historical Society.

The Deanna Rose Children's Farmstead is a  farm with animals, hay rides, a fishing pond, an early 1900s school house, and a children's gold mining camp.

The Overland Park Golf Division operates two public golf courses: St. Andrews Golf Club and the Sykes Lady Golf Club. These courses host more than 130,000 rounds of golf a year.

Scheels Overland Park Soccer Complex was named the top soccer facility in the nation by Livability because it is considered the only complex of its kind in the United States.

The city is also home to Overland Park Convention Center.

In 2015, Topgolf driving range and entertainment complex opened in Overland Park.  It offers a driving range, bar, and restaurant complex, and employs more than 450 people.

Historic Downtown Overland Park contains a farmers' market, the clocktower plaza and a statue of Overland Park City founder William B. Strang Jr.  It also hosts the Strang Carriage House and is home to the Overland Park Historical Society.

The Nerman Museum of Contemporary Art is on the campus of Johnson County Community College.

The city has numerous public art works installed under the Public Art Program.

There are two community centers in the city: Matt Ross Community Center and Tomahawk Ridge Community Center.

Religion
Overland Park is highly populated by Protestants, reflective of the overall population of the state of Kansas. Large Baptist, Methodist, Nazarene and Pentecostal churches dot the landscape of Overland Park as well as its neighboring suburbs. Overland Park is also home to a relatively small Muslim population. The Islamic Center of Johnson County serves as a mosque and a community center for Muslims in Overland Park. There is also a growing Hindu, Sikh, and Buddhist population in Overland Park and surrounding areas.

Overland Park is also served by a number of synagogues: Congregation Beth Israel Abraham Voliner, an Orthodox synagogue established in Kansas City, Missouri, in 1894. Other Orthodox synagogues include the Chabad House Center which serves as the Chabad Headquarters for Kansas and Missouri, and the Torah Learning Center. There are several other synagogues, too, including Kehilath Israel, Congregation Beth Torah, and The Temple, Congregation B'nai Jehudah.

Also, Overland Park is home to a significant number of Roman Catholics.  Overland Park falls within the boundaries of the Archdiocese of Kansas City in Kansas.  Parishes such as St. Michael the Archangel, Holy Cross, Holy Spirit, Ascension and Queen of the Holy Rosary serve Catholics in Overland Park. Holy Cross offers a Spanish mass for the Hispanic community in the city.

In popular culture
The city has developed a positive reputation in American media as an affordable and family-friendly community. CNNMoney.com has consistently ranked it in the top 10 of its 100 Best Places to Live in the United States. In 2015 Forbes ranked the city among the 25 Best Suburbs for retirement. In 2015 Overland Park was named No 1 in the nation for "Top 10 Best Cities for Families". It was also recognized as No. 15 for "America's 50 Best Cities to Live " by 24/7 Wall Street. It was awarded the No. 1 city in the country for first time home buyers in 2015 by WalletHub, citing its low crime rate and outstanding schools. BusinessWeek ranked the city as one of "The Best Places to Raise Your Kids", and U.S. News & World Report ranked it among "America's 10 Best Places to Grow Up". In 2014, Housing Wire ranked it number three in its list of "The 10 absolute best housing markets for families". In 2018, it was awarded "Best city to raise a family" by WalletHub and "One of the most popular cities for millennials" by CNBC.

Overland Park is the setting of the 2008 documentary series High School Confidential, the 2009–2011 television series, United States of Tara, and the web series The Most Popular Girls in School.

Notable people

People who were born in, or have lived in, Overland Park include film directors Michael Almereyda (Hamlet) and Darren Lynn Bousman (Saw), actors Rob Riggle, Tom Kane, Paul Rudd, Jason Sudeikis, Sarah Lancaster, John Lehr, Todd Bosley, David Dastmalchian, and eSports player Johnathan Wendel.

Sister cities
Overland Park has one sister city.
 Bietigheim-Bissingen, Baden-Württemberg, Germany

References

Further reading

External links

 
 Overland Park - Visitor's Bureau
 Overland Park city map, KDOT

 
Cities in Kansas
Cities in Johnson County, Kansas
Cities in Kansas City metropolitan area
Populated places established in 1905
1905 establishments in Kansas